Zodiaque was a 74-gun   of the French Navy.

Career

Seven Years' War 
In 1757, Zodiaque was under d'Aché. on 5 June, she helped capture a British corvette.

She took part in the Battle of Pondicherry on 10 September 1759. In 1760, she was under La Tullaye at Isle de France.

Interwar 
In 1776, Zodiaque was under Du Chaffault, as flagship of his division in the Escadre d'évolution that year.

War of American Independence 
In 1778, Zodiaque was in the First Division of the White squadron in the fleet under Orvilliers. She took part in the Battle of Ushant on 27 July 1778 under La Porte Vézins, with Cicé-Champion as first officer. The year after, she was attached to the Armada of 1779.

In 1780, Zodiaque was under Roquefeuil-Montpeyroux. On 6 June, she and Néréide captured the 10-gun British privateer cutter Prince of Wales.

In 1781, Zodiaque was at Brest under Retz.

In 1782, Zodiaque was first under Senneville, and later under Langan-Boisfévrier, who captained her at the Battle of Cape Spartel  on 20 October 1782.

Fate 
Zodiaque was sold  in 1784.

Sources and references 
 Notes

Citations

Bibliography
 
 

 
 

External links
 

Ships of the line of the French Navy
Diadème-class ships of the line
Ships built in France
1756 ships